Whelpo is a hamlet in the civil parish of Caldbeck, in the Allerdale district, in the county of Cumbria, England. It is about one mile west of the village of Caldbeck. It can be accessed by the A5299 road. The hamlet contains two listed buildings – Whelpo Head, an 18th-century former farmhouse, and Whelpo Bridge, a stone bridge traversing Whelpo Beck. The other feature in the hamlet is the aforementioned Whelpo Beck, also referred to as Cald Beck, which is a tributary to the River Calder. The beck has a catchment area of 39.6 km2.

The name "Whelpo" means "hill of the whelps", coming from Old Norse hvelpr.

References 

Hamlets in Cumbria
Caldbeck